Smardz is a Polish surname. Notable people with the surname include:
 Karolyn Smardz Frost, Canadian historian
 Kevin Smardz (born 1975), American politician

See also
 

Polish-language surnames